Greatest Hits is a greatest hits album and fourth album by NB Ridaz. It was released on July 15, 2008.

Track listing
 "So Fly" (produced by Big Fenix & Dj 2Swift)
 "Pretty Girl"
 "Runaway"
 "Lost in Love"
 "4-Ever"
 "Tu Eres"
 "Notice Me"
 "Until I Die"
 "Radio Song"
 "A Perfect Man"
 "Wishin"

References

2008 greatest hits albums
NB Ridaz albums